is a JR West Hakubi Line station. It is in a valley between two tunnels, and its access road goes directly beneath the station. The station is located in Hiwa, Sōja, Okayama Prefecture, Japan.

History
1987-04-01: Japanese National Railways is privatized, and Hiwa Station became a JR West station

Station layout
Hiwa Station has two platforms capable of handling two lines simultaneously. The platforms are connected via a footpath across the tracks.

Around the station
Hiwa Station is located within a bend in the Takahashi River, which is across Japan National Route 180, about 500m southeast of Hiwa Station. There are thirteen Shinto shrines and four Buddhist temples within one kilometer of the station. The Hiwadani River, a tributary of the Takahashi River, flows out of the Hiwa Valley above the station, emptying into the Takahashi River near the station. The Okayama Sōja plant of Nikken Lease Kōgyō, one of Japan's largest industrial and commercial equipment and supplies leasing companies, is visible from the station.

Highway access
 Japan National Route 180

Connecting lines
JR West Hakubi Line
Gōkei Station — Hiwa Station — Minagi Station

See also
List of Railway Stations in Japan

External links
 JR West

Hakubi Line
Railway stations in Okayama Prefecture
Railway stations in Japan opened in 1956